Qagan Qehe (Uyghur script: چاغانچېكە يېزىسى, Чаган Чәхә) is a mining township on the Kaidu River in Central Xinjiang Uyghur Autonomous Region of the People's Republic of China. It is under the administration of Yanqi Hui Autonomous County in Bayin'gholin Mongol Autonomous Prefecture. According to the 2006 census, the township has a population of 5115 people, with 3712 living in the rural part of the township. Main products include grains, oil, sugar beet, fennel and tomatoes.

References

External links
Hudong Encyclopedia 

Populated places in Xinjiang
Township-level divisions of Xinjiang
Yanqi Hui Autonomous County